7th Congress may refer to:
7th Congress of the Philippines (1970–1972)
7th Congress of the Russian Communist Party (Bolsheviks) (1918)
7th National Congress of the Chinese Communist Party (1945)
7th National Congress of the Communist Party of Vietnam (1991)
7th National Congress of the Kuomintang (1952)
7th National People's Congress (1988–1993)
7th United States Congress (1801–1803)
International Socialist Congress, Stuttgart 1907, the 7th Congress of the Socialist International
7th Congress of the Workers' Party of Korea (2016)
Seventh World Congress of the Comintern (1935)